Sergio Segura García (born 7 July 1995) is a Spanish footballer who plays for Internacional de Madrid as an attacking midfielder.

Club career
Born in Leganés, Madrid, Arribas represented Real Madrid and CD Leganés as a youth. He made his senior debut with the latter's reserves in 2014, in the regional leagues.

On 21 December 2016 Arribas made his first team debut, coming on as a late substitute for Darwin Machís in a 1–2 away loss against Valencia CF for the season's Copa del Rey. He made his La Liga debut on 17 April 2018, replacing José Naranjo in a 1–2 loss against Villarreal CF.

References

External links
Leganés profile 

1995 births
Living people
People from Leganés
Spanish footballers
Footballers from the Community of Madrid
Association football midfielders
La Liga players
Segunda División B players
Tercera División players
CD Leganés B players
CD Leganés players
CD Paracuellos Antamira players
Internacional de Madrid players